Rikidōzan is a 2004 South Korean-Japanese film written and directed by Song Hae-sung. The film is based on the life of Rikidōzan, a legendary ethnic Korean professional wrestler who became a national hero in Japan in the 1950s. It stars Sol Kyung-gu in the titular role, with Miki Nakatani, Tatsuya Fuji, and actual Japanese wrestlers Keiji Mutoh and Masakatsu Funaki in the cast.

Cast
Rikidōzan/Kim Sin-rak: Sol Kyung-gu
Aya: Miki Nakatani
Yuzuru Yoshimachi: Masato Hagiwara
Keiko Oki: Sawa Suzuki
Kōichi Kasai: Tarō Yamamoto
Masahiko Kimura: Masakatsu Funaki†
Kim Myon-gil: Park Chul-min
Kim Il: No Jun-ho
Kōkichi Endō: Jun Akiyama†
Toyonobori: Muhammad Yone†
Harold Sakata: Keiji Mutoh†
Azumanami: Shinya Hashimoto†
Ben Sharpe: Mike Polchlopek†
Mike Sharpe: Jim Steele†
Mr. Atomic (Clyde Steeves): Rick Steiner†
Wrestler: Makoto Hashi†
Wrestler: Go Shiozaki†
Wrestler: Koji Yoshida
Wrestler: Chikara Momota
Announcer: Shigeru Kajiwara
Interviewer: Masami Ogishima
NTV President: Shinji Nomura
Nishonoyama Oyakata: Kazuyuki Senba
Kenichi Tamura: Munenori Iwamoto
New Havana Club M.C.: Magy
Middle-Aged Woman: Rei Okamoto
Takeo Kanno: Tatsuya Fuji

†denotes an actual professional wrestler

Reception
Sol Kyung-gu gained 20 kilograms (44 lbs.) for the role and also delivered 95% of his lines in Japanese. Despite winning great praise for his performance, however, the film vastly underperformed in the box office on its local release, with total admissions at 1,249,794.

Nevertheless, Rikidozan was recognized at the 42nd Grand Bell Awards, winning Best Director for Song Hae-sung, and Best Cinematography for Kim Hyung-koo.

References

External links 
 
 
 Rikidozan at Sony Pictures Japan

2004 films
2000s sports drama films
2004 biographical drama films
South Korean sports drama films
South Korean biographical films
Sports films based on actual events
Biographical films about sportspeople
Professional wrestling films
Films set in the 1950s
Films set in the 1960s
Films set in Japan
Films directed by Song Hae-sung
CJ Entertainment films
2000s Japanese-language films
2000s Korean-language films
Japanese multilingual films
South Korean multilingual films
Cultural depictions of South Korean men
Cultural depictions of professional wrestlers
2004 drama films
South Korean films based on actual events
2000s South Korean films